Oud Holland – Journal for Art of the Low Countries is a quarterly peer-reviewed academic journal covering art from the (Northern) Netherlands and Southern Netherlands (Belgium) from c. 1400–1920. Oud Holland is the oldest surviving art-historical journal in the world. It was founded by Adriaan de Vries and Nicolaas de Roever in 1883, since then 132 volumes have appeared. From 1972 the journal has been published by the RKD – Netherlands Institute for Art History; since 2008 in collaboration with Brill Publishers. The editorial board consists of Elmer Kolfin (editor-in-chief), Menno Jonker (managing editor), John Bezold (online review editor), Jan Dirk Baetens, Yvonne Bleyerveld, Edwin Buijsen, Nils Büttner, Volker Manuth, Tine Luk Meganck, Ingrid Vermeulen. Articles are published in English and occasionally in Dutch.

Abstracting and indexing 
The journal is abstracted and indexed in:

References

External links 
 

Art history journals
Dutch-language journals
Publications established in 1883
English-language journals
Multilingual journals
Brill Publishers academic journals
Quarterly journals
French-language journals
German-language journals
1883 establishments in the Netherlands